Appula is a genus of beetles in the family Cerambycidae, containing the following species:

 Appula aliena Martins, 1981
 Appula argenteoapicalis Fuchs, 1961
 Appula diamantinensis Franceschini, 2002
 Appula eduardae Franceschini, 2002
 Appula lateralis (White, 1853)
 Appula melancholica Gounelle, 1909
 Appula nigripes Bates, 1870
 Appula santarensis Franceschini, 2002
 Appula sericatula Gounelle, 1909
 Appula undulans (White, 1853)

References

Elaphidiini